SHARC may refer to:

 S.H.A.R.C., a fictional vehicle in the G.I. Joe universe
 Shute Park Aquatic & Recreation Center
 Submillimeter High Angular Resolution Camera of the Caltech Submillimeter Observatory
 Super Harvard Architecture Single-Chip Computer, a DSP made by Analog Devices
 Swedish Highly Advanced Research Configuration
 Surface Hopping including ARbitrary Couplings - acronym used for the SHARC molecular dynamics software
 SHARC, the Sunriver Homeowners Aquatic and Recreation Center in Sunriver, Oregon.
 SHARC: Submarine High-fidelity Active-monitoring of Renewable-energy Cables (National Oceanography Centre, Southampton, UK)

See also 
 Shark (disambiguation)